The Clemson Tigers baseball teams represented Clemson University in Clemson, South Carolina, United States in the sport of college baseball in the NCAA Division I Atlantic Coast Conference.  The program was established in 1896, and has continuously fielded a team since 1945.  In this decade, the Tigers reached the College World Series in Omaha, Nebraska three times, reached the Super Regional round an additional four times, and made nine total appearances in the NCAA Division I Baseball Championship.

2000

2001

Roster

Schedule

Rankings

2002

2003

Roster

Schedule

Rankings

2004

Roster

Schedule

Rankings

2005

Roster

Schedule

Rankings

2006

2007

Roster

Schedule

Rankings

2008

2009

References

Clemson Tigers baseball seasons